A4000 may refer to: 

 Yamaha A4000, a Yamaha sampler
 Acorn Archimedes 4000, a 1992 computer
 Adelaide Metro A-City 4000 Class
 Amiga 4000, a 1992 Commodore computer